Alfons Franck (unknown – unknown) was a Belgian chess player, Belgian Chess Championships winner (1958).

Biography
From the end of 1930s to end of 1950s Alfons Franck was one of Belgium's leading chess players. He was a multiple participant of the Belgian Chess Championship. In 1958, in Blankenberge Alfons Franck won this tournament. 

Alfons Franck played for Belgium in the Chess Olympiads:
 In 1954, at first reserve board in the 11th Chess Olympiad in Amsterdam (+0, =2, -4),
 In 1958, at second board in the 13th Chess Olympiad in Munich (+0, =5, -11),
 In 1960, at first reserve board in the 14th Chess Olympiad in Leipzig (+4, =2, -5).

References

External links

Alfons Franck chess games at 365Chess.com

Year of birth missing
Year of death missing
Belgian chess players
Chess Olympiad competitors
20th-century chess players